Canada competed at the 1972 Winter Olympics in Sapporo, Japan. Canada has competed at every Winter Olympic Games.

The one silver medal won by Karen Magnussen ties with the Canadian Olympic Team of 1936 for the lowest medal total by a Canadian Winter Olympic Team.

Medalists

Alpine skiing

Men

Men's slalom

Women

Bobsleigh

Cross-country skiing

Men

Men's 4 × 10 km relay

Women

Women's 3 × 5 km relay

Figure skating

Men

Women

Pairs

Luge

Men

(Men's) Doubles

Ski jumping

Speed skating

Men

Women

References

 Olympic Winter Games 1972, full results by sports-reference.com

Nations at the 1972 Winter Olympics
1972
Winter Olympics